Eriopterini is a tribe of limoniid crane flies in the family Limoniidae. There are more than 20 genera and 3,800 described species in Eriopterini.

Genera
These 27 genera belong to the tribe Eriopterini:

 Arctoconopa Alexander, 1955
 Cheilotrichia Rossi
 Chionea Dalman, 1816 (snow flies)
 Cladura Osten Sacken, 1859
 Cryptolabis Osten-Sacken, 1859
 Erioptera Meigen, 1800
 Eugnophomyia Alexander, 1947
 Gnophomyia Osten Sacken, 1859
 Gonempeda Alexander, 1924
 Gonomyia Meigen
 Gonomyodes Alexander, 1948
 Gonomyopsis Alexander, 1966
 Hesperoconopa Alexander, 1948
 Idiognophomyia Alexander, 1956
 Lipsothrix Loew, 1873
 Molophilus Curtis, 1833
 Neocladura Alexander, 1920
 Neolimnophila Alexander, 1920
 Ormosia Rondani, 1856
 Phantolabis Alexander, 1956
 Rhabdomastix Skuse, 1890
 Sigmatomera Osten-Sacken, 1869
 Styringomyia (Loew)
 Symplecta Meigen, 1830
 Tasiocera Skuse, 1890
 Teucholabis Osten Sacken, 1859
 Toxorhina Loew, 1850

References

External links

Limoniidae
Nematocera tribes